The Peveto Woods Bird & Butterfly Sanctuary (formerly known as Hollyman-Sheeley Sanctuary) is a 40-acre Sanctuary that is reserved and maintained by the Baton Rouge Audubon Society. It is located on the Creole Nature Trail.

As many as two million birds use the sanctuary each year.

Scientists from the University of Southern Mississippi have used the sanctuary as a site for research on migrant songbirds since 1984.

Location

LA 82, 8.5 miles west of LA 27/LA 82 intersection

Found directly at the center of the Trans-Gulf migration path on the edge of the Gulf of Mexico, Peveto Woods is a uniquely located chenier habitat ecologically vital to a host of winged wonders — both birds and butterflies.

History

In August 1984, through the generosity of Mr. Robert W. Holleyman of Lake Charles LA and Dr. Carlton Sheely, III, of Baton Rouge LA, the first tract of six acres was purchased. Several small parcels were added in the following two years.

In July 1989, the Henshaw Sanctuary was created with the sale and donation of the unsold portions of the subdivision by Mr. H. Marsh Henshaw, III, of Sulphur. Subsequent additions of several undeveloped lots came in August 1990 and February 1992.

In 1993, 27 acres were added on the north side reaching up to La. Hwy. 82.

In 1994, one of the sand pits was filled in and replanted about six acres with 1,600 live oak seedlings.

Restoration projects of various kinds are ongoing.

Activities
 Birdwatching
 Butterfly observation
 Nature photography

Birds

In the fall, Peveto Woods is a last stop for food and rest as birds head south over the Gulf. In the spring, as birds cross the Gulf heading north, it is the first stop for food and rest.

Peveto Woods’ avian visitors include the brightly plumed spring warblers, tanagers and orioles as well as more sought after species such as the Scarlet Tanager, Rose-breasted Grosbeak, Cerulean Warbler, and Cape May Warbler. Lucky birders may spot Townsend's Warbler, Hepatic Tanager and Hooded Oriole.

Butterflies

Common sightings include the black, spicebush, tiger, zebra and pipevine swallowtails; the gorgone and pearl crescents; red admiral; buckeye; cloudless sulphur; spring azure; variegated and gulf fritillaries; zebra longwing; hackberry; queen; viceroy; and red spotted purple. 
Late fall to early summer are the best times for sightings, but some remain year round.

References

Protected areas of Louisiana
Birdwatching sites in the United States
Bird sanctuaries of the United States
Protected areas established in 1984
1984 establishments in Louisiana